Devil's Den, subtitled "Hood's Assault at Gettysburg", is a board game published by Operational Studies Group (OSG) in  1980 that simulates the fighting to control the key Devil's Den terrain feature during the 1863 Battle of Gettysburg during the American Civil War.

Background
During the second day of the three-day battle of Gettysburg, Devil's Den, a strategic hill, proved to be a weak spot in the Union battle line, and was overrun by Confederate troops from Alabama, Texas and Arkansas after fierce fighting.

Description
Devil's Den simulates the Confederate assault on the original Union position at Devil's Den.

Components
The game box contains:
22" x 34" paper hex grid map of the ground between Little Round Top and Big Round Top, scaled at 30 yd (27 m) per hex
 400 die-cut counters
 rule book
 Study folder
player aid charts
two 6-sided dice

Gameplay
Several scenarios are included with the game, including one for the Confederate assault on Little Round Top.

Publication history
Leonard Millman and Dr. David Martin had previously produced the American Civil War wargame 20th Maine, published by OSG in 1979. The next year, Millman and Martin designed Devil's Den using many of the same rules; it was also published by OSG.

In 1985, Avalon Hill acquired the rights to the game, and revised the rules to include basic and advanced games. It was then republished with artwork by Charles Kibler and George I. Parrish, Jr.

Reception
In Issue 54 of Moves, Steve List considered this a much more refined game than its predecessor, 20th Maine, but noted that "The game plays well, but slowly compared to 20th Maine because of the greater number of counters and markers in play. It is no worse in this respect than any of the [Terrible Swift Sword] family, though." List concluded by giving Devil's Den a grade of B+.

References

American Civil War board wargames
Board games introduced in 1980
Operational Studies Group games